Caristius is a genus of manefishes native to the Atlantic and Pacific Oceans.

Ecology
A member of the genus Caristius associates with the siphonophore Bathyphysa conifera, using it for shelter, stealing meals, and perhaps nibbling on its host as well, yet protecting it from amphipod parasites such as Themisto.  This symbiotic relationship appears mutualistic.

Species
The currently recognized species in this genus are:
 Caristius andriashevi Kukuev, Parin & Trunov, 2012
 Caristius barsukovi Kukuev, Parin & Trunov, 2013
 Caristius digitus D. E. Stevenson & Kenaley, 2013
 Caristius fasciatus (Borodin, 1930)
 Caristius japonicus T. N. Gill & H. M. Smith, 1905
 Caristius litvinovi Kukuev, Parin & Trunov, 2013
 Caristius macropus (Bellotti, 1903) (Manefish)
 Caristius meridionalis D. E. Stevenson & Kenaley, 2013
 Caristius walvisensis Kukuev, Parin & Trunov, 2013

References

Caristiidae
Marine fish genera
Perciformes genera
Taxa named by Theodore Gill
Taxa named by Hugh McCormick Smith